Mike Clark (born October 28, 1964) is an American heavy metal and punk rock guitarist. He is best known for being the rhythm guitarist with Suicidal Tendencies, a band he played with from 1987 to 2012, and was the only member besides Mike Muir to return to the band when it reunited. He originally played in the thrash metal band No Mercy of which Muir was also the vocalist. During Suicidal Tendencies' hiatus he was a member of the thrash/rap rock band Creeper.

Throughout his time with Suicidal Tendencies, Clark was very active in the band's songwriting, writing much of the music for his first album with the band, How Will I Laugh Tomorrow When I Can't Even Smile Today. His early compositions were mostly thrash-oriented but stuck to the bands already melodic sound. He continued to write music for the band that covered many different styles, best illustrated by The Art of Rebellion. As Clark claimed in an interview, "This is definitely our most diverse album yet, but it wasn't really planned that way, it's just the way we've grown musically."

Clark has had endorsement deals with B.C. Rich, Jackson and Yamaha guitars. He used to play a custom made BC Rich Gunslinger guitar with a skull wearing the classic Suicidal flip cap painted on it. Since the mid-1990s, he has played only Fernandes guitars, which he continues to endorse. Clark's early trademark image was his straight long hair and the "Suicidal" flip-cap. He has since cut his hair and began wearing a blue bandana.

On May 31, 2012, in Santa Cruz, California, Clark suffered a head injury during a pre-show incident resulting in concussion that also required nine staples to a gash on his head. This prompted Clark to leave Suicidal Tendencies. He did, however, provide rhythm guitar on four tracks from the band's 2013 album 13 ("Shake It Out", "God Only Knows Who I Am", "Who's Afraid?" and "Cyco Style"), where he is credited as an "additional musician".

On June 6, 2012, a music video by one of Clark's bands, Phenagen, was released.

Clark has a daughter named Christina.

Discography

with No Mercy
Widespread Bloodshed Love Runs Red (1987)
OG No Mercy (2008)

with Suicidal Tendencies
How Will I Laugh Tomorrow When I Can't Even Smile Today (1988)
Controlled by Hatred/Feel Like Shit...Déjà Vu (1989)
Lights...Camera...Revolution! (1990)
The Art of Rebellion (1992)
Still Cyco After All These Years (1993)
Suicidal for Life (1994)
Prime Cuts (1997)
 Six the Hard Way EP (1998)
Freedumb (1999)
Free Your Soul and Save My Mind (2000)
Year of the Cycos (2008)
No Mercy Fool!/The Suicidal Family (2010)
13 (2013)

with Great Gods of Greed
Great Gods of Greed (2012)

Compilations
Friends & Family, Vol. 1 (1997)

References

Living people
1964 births
American heavy metal guitarists
Suicidal Tendencies members
20th-century American guitarists